Brentus is a genus of beetles belonging to the family Brentidae.

The species of this genus are found America.

Species

Species:

Brentus anchorago 
Brentus approximatus 
Brentus armiger

References

Brentidae